High Times – The Best of Fools Garden is a best-of compilation album by German pop band Fools Garden, released on October 2, 2009, on Fools Garden's own label Ladybird Music and BMG Rights Management (it is one of the first new releases from BMG Rights Management). It features 14 tracks taken from the band's back catalogue, plus one new recording. Ten of the tracks were released in the past as singles (eleven if counting the new track and single, "High Time"). The compilation doesn't include any song from band's first two albums and omits eight of their later singles, such as "Pieces", "It Can Happen", "Happy", "In the Name", "Closer", "Man of Devotion", "Does Anybody Know?" and "Cold". The songs "Lemon Tree", "Wild Days" and "Suzy" have been rerecorded for this compilation.

Track listing
All songs written by Peter Freudenthaler and Volker Hinkel, except Track 9 by Freudenthaler, Hinkel and Gabriel Holz

 "Lemon Tree"
 "Wild Days"
Tracks 1-2: original version on the album Dish of the Day
 "Probably"
 "Why Did She Go?"
 "Rainy Day"
Tracks 3-5: from the album Go and Ask Peggy for the Principal Thing
 "Suzy"
Track 6: original version on the album For Sale
 "Dreaming"
Track 7: original version on the album 25 Miles to Kissimmee
 "Welcome Sun"
 "Count on Me"
 "Comedy Song
 "Life"
Tracks 8-11 from the album Ready for the Real Life
 "I Got a Ticket"
Track 12: previously unreleased on an album
 "Home"
 "Million Dollar Baby"
Tracks 13-14: from the EP Home
 "High Time"
Track 15: previously unreleased

References

External links
 

2009 greatest hits albums
Fools Garden albums